This article displays the qualifying draw of the 2011 Abierto Mexicano Telcel.

Players

Seeds

  Rui Machado (first round)
  Frederico Gil (qualifying competition, lucky loser)
  Horacio Zeballos (qualifying competition, lucky loser)
  Albert Ramos-Viñolas (qualified)
  Máximo González (qualified)
  Daniel Muñoz-de la Nava (qualifying competition, lucky loser)
  Diego Junqueira (first round)
  Paul Capdeville (qualified)

Qualifiers

  Adrian Ungur
  Paul Capdeville
  Máximo González
  Albert Ramos-Viñolas

Lucky losers

  Frederico Gil
  Horacio Zeballos
  Daniel Muñoz-de la Nava
  Iván Navarro

Qualifying draw

First qualifier

Second qualifier

Third qualifier

Fourth qualifier

References
 Qualifying Draw

2011 Abierto Mexicano Telcel
Abierto Mexicano Telcel - qualifying
Qualification for tennis tournaments